Laura Tarita Alarcón Rapu is a Rapa Nui Chilean politician, current governor of Easter Island since 16 March 2018.

She earned a degree in anthropology and until 2018 was member of the Valparaíso Region Council for the province of Easter for two tenures. On 5 March 2018, being a defensor of Rapa Nui traditions, culture, heritage and language, at the age of 41 newly elected president of Chile Sebastián Piñera named her the new governor of the Island, succeeding Melania Hotu. She worked in the "Te Hokinga Mai" project, consisting of the return of local heritage that was abroad.

References

Living people
Governors of provinces of Chile
Rapanui politicians
Easter Island people
Women governors of provinces of Chile
Indigenous people of South America
Year of birth missing (living people)